The canton of Corbeil-Essonnes is an administrative division of the Essonne department, Île-de-France region, northern France. It was created at the French canton reorganisation which came into effect in March 2015. Its seat is in Corbeil-Essonnes.

It consists of the following communes:
Corbeil-Essonnes
Écharcon
Lisses
Villabé

References

Cantons of Essonne